Michael Burdock (September 3, 1929 – February 13, 1998) was an American sprint canoer who competed in the early 1950s. He competed in the K-1 1000 m event at the 1952 Summer Olympics in Helsinki, but was eliminated in the heats.

References
Sports-reference.com profile

1929 births
1998 deaths
American male canoeists
Canoeists at the 1952 Summer Olympics
Olympic canoeists of the United States